Othello Ballet Suite/Electronic Organ Sonata No. 1 is an album by composer George Russell which was recorded in Europe and released by the Swedish Sonet Records and by the Flying Dutchman label in the US in 1970. The album was reissued in 1981 on the Italian Soul Note label

Recording
Othello was recorded November 3, 1967, at the studios of Radio Sweden in Stockholm. 
The basic material for Electronic Organ Sonata was recorded October 1, 1968 on the grand church organ of Grorud Church, Oslo. Technical work and final assemblage was performed in the electronic music studios of Radio Sweden.

Reception

AllMusic reviewer Ron Wynn stated: "An uneven but compelling work by George Russell that combines jazz, classical, and Shakespeare. The results range from magnificent to chaotic; there's a large band that includes mostly obscure foreign musicians. It was one of the first times that Norway's Jan Garbarek appeared playing tenor sax on a major label".

Tracks
1. Othello Ballet Suite (Part I)
Alto Saxophone – Arne Domnerus
Drums – Jon Christensen
Orchestra – Swedish Radio Symphony Orchestra, The
Tenor Saxophone – Bernt Rosengren, Jan Garbarek
Trumpet – Rolf Eriksson

2. Othello Ballet Suite (Part II)
Alto Saxophone – Arne Domnerus
Drums – Jon Christensen
Orchestra – Swedish Radio Symphony Orchestra, The
Tenor Saxophone – Bernt Rosengren, Jan Garbarek
Trumpet – Rolf Eriksson (

3. Electronic Organ Sonata No. 1
Engineer [Recording] – Bjornar Andresen, Kåre Kolberg
Organ [Church Organ] – George Russell

Credits
Mixed by, Engineer – Gote Nilsson
Producer, composed by – George Russell

References

George Russell (composer) albums
1970 albums
Flying Dutchman Records albums
Sonet Records albums
Black Saint/Soul Note albums